Ontoros Antanom, also known as Antanum or Antanom (1885-1915) was a Murut warrior from North Borneo who led a rebellion against the North Borneo Chartered Company (NBCC). Claiming to have supernatural powers, he united several Murut chiefs from Keningau, Tenom, Pensiangan and Rundum in opposing the policies of the NBCC in North Borneo and launched the Rundum Rebellion in 1915. The rebellion was immediately suppressed by the company, and the conflict led to a heavy death toll amongst the Murut.

Rundum Rebellion

Under the administration of North Borneo Chartered Company (NBCC), municipal administration was governed by the Village Ordinance of 1891. This ordinance fundamentally changed the status of the chiefs, the traditional indigenous tribal leaders in the region. Following its implementation, the NBCC only accepted those chiefs who had appointed them as community leaders. Other chieftains, who had played an important role for generations, were either shut down or branded as criminals or troublemakers. Disrespect for these traditional leaders contributed to the decision of Antanum to rebel against the company.

Claiming to have supernatural powers, he united several Murut chiefs from Keningau, Tenom, Pensiangan and Rundum in opposing the policies of the NBCC in North Borneo and launched the Rundum Rebellion in 1915. Hundreds of Murut rebels successfully attacked the Company administration building, and Antanum ordered the construction of underground tunnels to aid his fellow rebels during the rebellion. 

In response, the Company sent 400 soldiers equipped with firearms to counterattack in April 1915. Though the Muruts were only using their primitive weapons such as blowguns, swords and spears, the Company soldiers failed to defeat them. Subsequently, they decided to lay a trap for Antanum; inviting him to a peace conference at Rundum. When he and his followers were on their way to the conference, they were surrounded by hundred of Company soldiers and arrested. Antanum was eventually executed, bringing an end to his resistance.

References

Murut people
People from Sabah
British North Borneo
1885 births
1915 deaths
Malaysian rebels
Malaysian warriors
Grand Commanders of the Order of Kinabalu